Suniti Namjoshi (born 1941 in Mumbai, India) is a poet and a fabulist. She grew up in India, worked in Canada and at present lives in the southwest of England with English writer Gillian Hanscombe.  Her work is playful, inventive and often challenges prejudices such as racism, sexism, and homophobia.  She has written many collections of fables and poetry, several novels, and more than a dozen children's books. Her work has been translated into several languages, including Spanish, Italian, Dutch, Chinese, Korean, Hindi and Turkish.

Early life
Suniti Namjoshi was born in Mumbai in 1941. Her father, Manohar Vinayak Namjoshi, was senior test pilot at Hindustan Aircraft in Bangalore.  He was killed when his plane crashed in 1953. Her mother, Sarojini Namjoshi, née Naik Nimbalkar, was from Phaltan.

Suniti was sent to Woodstock, an American mission school in the Himalayan foothills, and then to Rishi Valley in Andhra Pradesh where Jiddu Krishnamurti used to come and talk to the children for a couple of months each year.

Career
Having passed the IAS in 1964, she worked as an officer in the Indian Administrative Service before pursuing further education. She studied Public Administration and earned her Master's degree from the University of Missouri and earned a PhD from McGill University on Ezra Pound.

Namjoshi taught in the Department of English at the University of Toronto from 1972 to 1987. She wrote Feminist Fables in 1981. It was described in Feminism, one of her voices as a minor feminist classic and the work for which Namjoshi, who the article said produced a "brilliant body of work, marked by sparkling wit, word play and inventive power, emerged", is best known. She began writing full-time in 1987, publishing fiction and poetry works. Kaliyug - Circles Of Paradise (play) and Flesh And Paper (poetry) were written in collaboration Gillian Hanscombe. Namjoshi has been influenced by Virginia Woolf, Adrienne Rich, her friend Hilary Clare, and Kate Millett's Sexual Politics. She has been active in the feminist movement and gay liberation movements.

Namjoshi was Honorary Research Fellow at the Centre for Women's Studies at Exeter University in England from 1995 to 2001, and was a member of the Literary Panel of the Arts Council of England from 1993 to 1996.

In 1996 Namjoshi published Building Babel, a postmodern novel about building cultures, whose story continues online with a collaborative project that enables readers' contributions.

Namjoshi currently lives and writes in Devon, United Kingdom.

Published works

Fiction
Feminist Fables. London: Sheba Feminist Publishers, 1981.
The Conversations of Cow. London: The Women's Press, 1985. 
The Blue Donkey Fables. London: The Women's Press, 1988. 
The Mothers of Maya Diip. London: The Women's Press, 1989. 
Because of India: Selected Poems and Fables. London: Onlywomen Press, 1989. 
Feminist Fables, Spinifex Press, North Melbourne, 1993 
Saint Suniti and the Dragon. North Melbourne: Spinifex, 1993; London: Virago, 1994. 
Building Babel. North Melbourne: Spinifex, 1996.  
Goja: An Autobiographical Myth. North Melbourne: Spinifex, 2000.
Sycorax: New Fables and Poems. New Delhi: Penguin Books, 2006. 
The Fabulous Feminist: A Suniti Namjoshi Reader. Delhi: Zubaan, 2012; North Melbourne: Spinifex, 2012. 
Suki. Delhi: Penguin India, 2012; North Melbourne: Spinifex, 2013.
Foxy Aesop aka Aesop the Fox. Delhi: Zubaan, 2018; Melbourne: Spinifex, 2018

Poetry
Poems. Calcutta: Writers Workshop, 1967.
More Poems. Calcutta: Writers Workshop, 1971.
Cyclone In Pakistan. Calcutta: Writers Workshop, 1971.
The Jackass and the Lady. Calcutta: Writers Workshop, 1980.
The Authentic Lie. Fredericton, N.B.: Fiddlehead Poetry Books, 1982. 
From the Bedside Book of Nightmares. Fredericton, N.B.: Fiddlehead Poetry Books & Goose Lane Editions, 1984. 
Flesh and Paper (with Gillian Hanscombe). UK: Jezebel Tapes and Books, 1986; Charlottetown, P.E.I.: Ragweed Press, 1986. 
Because of India: Selected Poems and Fables. London: Onlywomen Press, 1989.
Sycorax: New Fables and Poems. New Delhi: Penguin Books, 2006.
The Fabulous Feminist: a Suniti Namjoshi Reader. New Delhi: Zubaan, 2012.

Children's
Aditi and the One-Eyed Monkey. London: Sheba Feminist Publishers, 1986.
Aditi and the Thames Dragon. Chennai, India: Tulika Publishers, 2002.
Aditi and the Marine Sage. Chennai, India: Tulika Publishers, 2004.
Aditi and the Techno Sage. Chennai, India: Tulika Publishers, 2005.
Aditi and Her Friends Take on the Vesuvian Giant. Chennai, India: Tulika Publishers, 2007.
Aditi and Her Friends Meet Grendel. Chennai, India: Tulika Publishers, 2007.
Aditi and Her Friends Help the Budapest Changeling. Chennai, India: Tulika Publishers, 2007.
Aditi and Her Friends In Search of Shemeek. Chennai, India: Tulika Publishers, 2008.
Gardy in the City of Lions. Chennai, India: Tulika Publishers, 2009.
Siril and The Spaceflower. Chennai, India: Tulika Publishers, 2009.
Monkeyji and the Word Eater. Chennai, India: Tulika Publishers, 2009.
Beautiful and the Cyberspace Runaway. Chennai, India: Tulika Publishers, 2009.
Blue and Other Stories. (art work Nilima Sheikh). Chennai, India: Tulika Publishers, 2012; North Melbourne: Spinifex, 2012.
Little i. Chennai, India: Tulika Publishers, 2014.
The Boy and Dragon Stories (pictures Krishna Bala Shenoi).  Chennai, India: Tulika Publishers, 2015

Translation
Poems of Govindagraj by Ram Ganesh Gadkari. Translated by Suniti Namjoshi and Sarojini Namjoshi. Calcutta: Writers Workshop, 1968.

References

Further reading
 "Subversive Fabulations: The Twofold Pull in Suniti Namjoshi's Feminist Fables" by Sabine Steinisch in Engendering Realism and Postmodernism: Contemporary Women Writers in Britain,  ed. Beate Neumeier (Amsterdam & New York: Rodopi, 2001)
 "Tropes of Transition: Words, Memory and the Immigrant Experience" by Michelle Gadpaille in Canadiana: Canada in the Sign of Migration and Trans-Culturalism, eds. Kalus-Dieter Ertler and Martin Löschnigg (Frankfurt: Peter Lang, Europäishcer Verlag der Wissenschaften, 2004)

External links
Works by or about Suniti Namjoshi in libraries (WorldCat catalog)
Suniti Namjoshi | The fantastic fabulist Mint article by Diya Kohli
Fashion Your Own Fables Indian Express article by Amritta Dutta  

Living people
1941 births
University of Missouri alumni
McGill University alumni
Academic staff of the University of Toronto
Academics of the University of Exeter
Women writers from Maharashtra
20th-century Indian women writers
Lesbian feminists
Lesbian poets
Poets from Maharashtra
20th-century Indian poets
Indian women poets
British LGBT poets
Indian LGBT poets
21st-century British writers
Fabulists